Antikajian is a surname. Notable people with the surname include:

Garrick Antikajian
Sarkis Antikajian